Aghmeed, also spelled Aghmide, is a village located about 37 km from Beirut, in the governorate of Mount Lebanon, in the Aley District. One can reach Aghmeed through Mdairej Road, Ain Dara and Al Azzounieh. Aghmeed is at an altitude of 1,200 m, close to Mount Barouk, which is famous for its cedar forest.

Other villages surrounding Aghmeed are : Al Azzounieh, Ain Dara, Sharoun, Bmahray, Alramlieh, Al Mreijat, Nabaa Al Safa and Ain Zhalta.

Populated places in Aley District